La Chaussée-Tirancourt is a commune in the Somme department in Hauts-de-France in northern France.

Geography

Population

Points of interest
 Samara historical park, recreating ancient civilization and habitation based on local archaeology, from paleolithic to Gallo-Roman times, including reconstructions of homes and other buildings set within the area's marshes. Includes the Arboretum de Samara.

See also
Communes of the Somme department
Réseau des Bains de Mer

References

Communes of Somme (department)
Ambiani